Death on High Mountain is a 1969 Italian-Spanish western film directed by Fred Ringold, written by Enzo Gicca Palli and José Mallorquí Figueroa, produced by Bruno Turchetto and scored by Luis Enríquez. It stars Agnès Spaak, Frank Brana, and Jesús Guzmán.

Cast

 Peter Lee Lawrence as Loring Vandervelt
 Louis Dawson as Francis Parker / Mark Harrison
 Tano Cimarosa as General Valiente
 Agnès Spaak as Daphne Vandervelt
 Antonio Gradoli as Frank Braddock
 Giovanni Pazzafini as Billiard Player
 Silvio Bagolini as Stevens
 Giampiero Littera as Sheriff
 Barbara Carroll as Arlena Braddock
 Jesús Areta as Agustine

References

External links
 

1969 Western (genre) films
1969 films
Italian Western (genre) films
Films directed by Fernando Cerchio
Films scored by Luis Bacalov
Films shot in Almería
Films shot in Madrid
Films shot in Rome
Films with screenplays by José Mallorquí
1960s Italian films